Sadullah Kısacık (born 1 January 1977) is a Turkish politician from the Justice and Development Party (AKP), who has served as a Member of Parliament for Adana from 7 June 2015, up until 1 November 2015.

Born in Adana, Kısacık graduated from Çukurova University as an industrial engineer, working as an advisor regarding quality control and engineering to over 500 companies. He first joined the AKP in 2002 as a member of its youth wing, having worked for and participated in the party's election campaigns in Adana before becoming an AKP Member of Parliament in June 2015.

See also
25th Parliament of Turkey

References

External links
 Collection of all relevant news items at Haberler.com
 Collection of all relevant news items at Milliyet
 Collection of all relevant news items at Son Dakika

Justice and Development Party (Turkey) politicians
Deputies of Adana
Members of the 25th Parliament of Turkey
Living people
People from Malatya
1977 births